Hugh William Priestley MC (19 September 1887 – 6 January 1932) was an English stockbroker and cricketer.  Priestley was a right-handed batsman who bowled right-arm medium pace.  He was born in Marylebone, London and later educated at Uppingham School, where he played for the school cricket team.

Priestley made a single Minor Counties Championship appearance for Buckinghamshire in 1907 against the Worcestershire Second XI. He later made his only first-class appearance for the Marylebone Cricket Club against Cambridge University in 1911. In the MCC first-innings he was dismissed for 31 by Henry Grierson.  In their second-innings, he scored 2 runs before being dismissed by the same bowler.  Hardy took a single wicket in the Cambridge University first-innings, that of university captain John Frederick Ireland for the cost of 16 runs from a single over.

Priestly was a stockbroker joining first the firm of Hichens Harrison and Company around 1909 and later moving to Laing and Cruickshank. In 1914 he joined the Post Office Rifles (the 8th Battalion London Regiment) and served in France from 27 January 1917. He was awarded the Military Cross in July 1918 and was severely wounded in August 1918. He became a partner in the Laing and Cruikshank before moving in 1923 to Mullens, Marshall, Steer, Lawford & Company where he became one of the official brokers to the Commissioners of the National Debt. As well as cricket he was an expert in dry fly fishing and shooting. He had married Elizabeth Grainger Hall in 1911 and they had three sons, the eldest Robert also played first-class cricket.

He died in Marylebone, London on 6 January 1932.

Honours and awards
On 26 July 1918 Captain Hugh William Priestley, London Regiment was awarded the Military Cross:

References

External links
Hugh Priestley at ESPNcricinfo
Hugh Priestley at CricketArchive

1887 births
1932 deaths
Military personnel from London
People from Marylebone
Cricketers from Greater London
People educated at Uppingham School
English cricketers
Buckinghamshire cricketers
Marylebone Cricket Club cricketers
British Army personnel of World War I
Recipients of the Military Cross
London Regiment officers
Stockbrokers